Joan Hideko Fujimura is an American sociologist and the Martindale-Bascom Professor Emerita of Sociology at the University of Wisconsin-Madison. She is the president of the Society for the Social Studies of Science. She was a fellow of the Institute for Advanced Study from 1999 to 2001 and of the Center for Advanced Study in the Behavioral Sciences at Stanford University from 2014 to 2015.

References

External links
Faculty page

Living people
American women sociologists
Sociologists of science
University of Wisconsin–Madison faculty
University of Washington alumni
University of California, Berkeley alumni
Center for Advanced Study in the Behavioral Sciences fellows
Institute for Advanced Study visiting scholars
21st-century American women scientists
20th-century American women scientists
Year of birth missing (living people)